Ningali Josie Lawford, also known as Ningali Lawford-Wolf and Josie Ningali Lawford, (1967 – 11 August 2019) was an Aboriginal Australian actress known for her roles in the films Rabbit-Proof Fence (2002), Bran Nue Dae (2009), and Last Cab to Darwin (2015), for which she was nominated for the AACTA Award for Best Actress in a Leading Role.

Early life and education
Ningali Josie Lawford  was born in 1967 on Christmas Creek Station, a cattle station in Wangkatjungka, near Fitzroy Crossing in Western Australia, where her father, a stockman, and mother, a domestic, worked. She was a member of the Walmadjari (Tjiwaling) people, and of the  Wangkatjunga language group.

After attending Kewdale Senior High School in Perth, she spent a year in Anchorage, Alaska, on an American Field Scholarship. Lawford trained in dance at the Aboriginal Islander Dance Theatre in Sydney.

Career
Lawford made her acting debut in the musical Bran Nue Dae, which premiered in Perth in 1990. She later appeared in the 2009 film version.

In 1994, Lawford premiered her one-woman show, Ningali, in Perth. It was co-written by stage directors Robyn Archer and Angela Chaplin, whom she had met the previous year. The show toured internationally and won the Fringe First Award for Best New Production at the 1995 Edinburgh Festival Fringe and the 1996 Green Room Award for Best Actress in a One Woman Show. Other theatre roles included Aliwa for Company B Belvoir (2001), Uncle Vanya (2005) and Jandamarra (2008) both for Black Swan Theatre Company.

In 2000, the satirical comedy Black and Tran premiered at the Melbourne Comedy Festival. It was a collaboration between Lawford and Vietnamese comedian Hung Le. It addressed "the issue of racial discrimination by ridiculing the stereotypes of Aboriginal and Vietnamese cultures".

Lawford played Maude, the mother of protagonist Molly, in the 2002 film Rabbit-Proof Fence.

In 2015, Lawford played the role of Polly in the film Last Cab to Darwin, for which she received an AACTA Award nomination for Best Actress in a Leading Role.

In 2017, Lawford voiced the character of Nanna on the National Indigenous Television (NITV) animated series Little J & Big Cuz, which features Indigenous Australian characters.

Lawford was involved in the development of The Secret River at the Sydney Theatre Company, narrating its return Sydney season and national tour in 2016, Adelaide Festival performances in 2018 and Edinburgh Festival performances in 2019.

She died of complications following a severe asthma attack while in Edinburgh, Scotland, during the tour, aged 52.

Personal life
Lawford had five children and two grandchildren. She moved to Kalbarri later in her career to pursue a break away from being an actress and to also spend more time raising her children before returning to film.

Works

Film

Stage

Television

Awards and nominations
She won awards for her one-woman theatre show Ningali, Aliwa, Uncle Vanya and Jandamarra.

References

External links
 

1967 births
2019 deaths
20th-century Australian actresses
21st-century Australian actresses
Actresses from Western Australia
Australian film actresses
Australian stage actresses
Australian television actresses
Deaths from asthma
Indigenous Australian actresses
Indigenous Australians from Western Australia
Indigenous Australian dancers